Mahatma: Life of Gandhi, 1869–1948  is a 1968 documentary biography film, detailing the life of Mahatma Gandhi. The film was produced by The Gandhi National Memorial Fund in cooperation with the Films Division of the Government of India, and was directed and scripted by Vithalbhai Jhaveri. Jhaveri also provides the commentary throughout the film. The film is in black and white, contains 33 reels (14 chapters), and runs for 330 minutes.

The film was made to seek to tell the life story Gandhi, and his incessant search for Truth.
The film contains animation, live photography and old prints to provide an integrated image of his life. The story itself is narrated using mostly Gandhi's own words.

There are several versions of the film. There is the 5 hour version in English, a shorter version which runs for 2 hours and 16 minutes, and an even shorter version which runs for an hour. A Hindi version exists, running for 2 hours and 20 minutes, and a German version at 1 hour and 44 minutes.

See also
 List of artistic depictions of Mohandas Karamchand Gandhi
 List of longest films by running time
 Vithalbhai Jhaveri
 Dinanath Gopal Tendulkar

References

External links 
 Mahatma Gandhi : Film : MAHATMA - Life of Gandhi, 1869-1948 (5hrs 10min) Channel of GandhiServe Foundation
 Mahatma: Life of Gandhi 1869 - 1948 streams and commentaries - Offers various versions of the movie for free online viewing and written commentaries on the film.
 Vithalbhai K. Javeri & D.G. Tendulkar, 1953

Films about Mahatma Gandhi
1968 films
Documentary films about politicians
1960s German-language films
1960s Hindi-language films
Black-and-white documentary films
Indian documentary films
1968 documentary films
1960s English-language films